"Wrinkles" is a song written by Neil Thrasher and Ronny Scaife, and recorded by American country music group Diamond Rio. It was released in July 2003 as the third single from the album Completely. The song reached number 16 on the Billboard Hot Country Singles & Tracks chart.

Chart performance
"Wrinkles" debuted at number 44 on the U.S. Billboard Hot Country Singles & Tracks for the week of August 2, 2003.

References

2003 singles
Diamond Rio songs
Songs written by Neil Thrasher
Arista Nashville singles
2002 songs
Songs written by Ronny Scaife